The German Boys & Girls Open is an annual international amateur golf tournament in Germany for boys and girls under the age of 18.

The tournament, founded in 2004 and held at Golf Club St. Leon-Rot near Heidelberg, is organized by the German Golf Association. It is a qualifying event for the European team in the Junior Ryder Cup and the Junior Solheim Cup and has been rated up to level "A" in the World Amateur Golf Ranking.

Format
The tournament is stroke play over 54 holes, 18 holes on each day of the tournament, with no cut. The field is limited to 100 boys and 100 girls, of any nationality, who compete concurrently but separately.

Winners

Girls

Boys

Source:

References

External links

Junior golf tournaments
Golf tournaments in Germany